Hebecarpa macradenia, synonym Polygala macradenia, the glandleaf milkwort, is a subshrub in the milkwort family (Polygalaceae) found in the Arizona Uplands of the Sonoran Desert. Its "odd" flowers are said to be "spectacularly beautiful" when viewed with a hand lens.

References

Polygalaceae